Beedi Basavanna is a 1967 Indian Kannada language film,  directed and produced by B. R. Panthulu. The film stars Rajkumar, Bharathi, Vandana (B. Vijayalakshmi) and Narasimharaju. The film has musical score by T. G. Lingappa. B. R. Panthulu remade the movie in Tamil in 1970 as Thedi Vandha Mappillai with minor changes.

Cast 

Rajkumar
Bharathi
B. Vijayalakshmi
Narasimharaju
Dinesh
Hanumantha Rao
Krishna Shastry
Basappa
Guggu
Shivaji
L. N. Swamy
Narayan
Keshavamurthy
Shyam
Rama Rao
Puttaswamy
Nagappa
Bangalore Nagesh
B. R. Panthulu
Papamma
B. Jaya
Shanthamma
Hema

Soundtrack 
The music was composed by T. G. Lingappa.

References

External links 

 

1967 films
1960s Kannada-language films
Films scored by T. G. Lingappa
Indian action drama films
Kannada films remade in other languages
Films directed by B. R. Panthulu
1960s action drama films